Dalila Di Lazzaro (born 29 January 1953) is an Italian model, actress and writer.

Life and career 
Born in Udine, Di Lazzaro started as a fashion model and was the subject of famous photographers such as Andy Warhol. She then gained attention in the tabloid press as a supposed relative of Sophia Loren and even a potential rival in love.

Between the mid-1970s and the early 1980s Di Lazzaro worked in notable films with directors such as Alberto Lattuada, Luigi Comencini, Florestano Vancini, Alberto Sordi, Dario Argento, Klaus Kinski and Jacques Deray, then focused primarily on television. In 1983 she refused the role of Domino, later played by Kim Basinger, in Never Say Never Again.

Her last role in a movie was in 2015 in 80 Voglia di te, directed by Andrea Vialardi.

She considers herself Roman Catholic.

Partial filmography

1972: It Can Be Done Amigo
1972: Il sindacalista - Girl at New Year's Eve party (uncredited)
1972: Your Vice Is a Locked Room and Only I Have the Key - Stripper (uncredited)
1972: The Scientific Cardplayer - Nurse (uncredited)
1972: Frankenstein 80 - Sonia
1973: Canterbury n° 2 - Nuove storie d'amore del '300 - Blonde Girl on the Beach (uncredited)
1973: Da Scaramouche or se vuoi l'assoluzione baciar devi sto... cordone! - Granduchessa Olimpia
1973: Andy Warhol's Frankenstein - Female Monster
1974: The Beast - Magda
1975: Sex Pot - Anna Chino
1975: Night Train Murders - Nurse Pauline (uncredited)
1976: Oh, Serafina! - Serafina Vitali
1976: L'Italia s'è rotta - Domenica Chiaregato
1977: Three Tigers Against Three Tigers - La Contessa
1977: The Cat - Wanda Yukovich
1978: The Pyjama Girl Case - Glenda Blythe
1978: The Last Romantic Lover - Dalila Di Lazzaro, la star
1979: Mimi - Therese
1980: Stark System - Lauda
1980: The Blue-Eyed Bandit - Stella
1980: Voltati Eugenio - Fernanda
1980: Three Men to Kill - Béa
1981: Quando la coppia scoppia - Angela - Enrico's wife
1981: Prima che sia troppo presto - Janet D'Angelo
1982: Una di troppo - Andrea Cooper
1982: Miss Right - Art Student
1984: Everybody in Jail - Singer Iris Del Monte
1985: Phenomena - Headmistress
1985: Killer contro killers - Cherry
1987: Sicilian Connection - Secretary
1989: Paganini - Helene von Feuerbach
1989: Spogliando Valeria - Eva
1990: Breath of Life - Teresa
1990: Alcune signore per bene - Allegra
1991: Strepitosamente... flop - Carla
1991: L'ulivo e l'alloro
1992: Dov'era lei a quell'ora? - Lucia
1993: Rose rosse per una squillo
1998: Kidnapping - La sfida (TV Movie) - Avvocato Iorio
1998: Mashamal - ritorno al deserto - Veruska
2013: The Fifth Wheel - Signora veneta
2015: 80 Voglia di te - (final film role)

References

External links 
 
 Official Website

1953 births
Living people
Italian film actresses
People from Udine
Italian female models
Italian television actresses
20th-century Italian actresses
Italian Roman Catholics